Chatham is an unincorporated community in London Grove Township in Chester County, Pennsylvania, United States. Chatham is located at the intersection of Pennsylvania Route 41 and Pennsylvania Route 841.

References

External links

Unincorporated communities in Chester County, Pennsylvania
Unincorporated communities in Pennsylvania